Jimmy Connelly (born October 27, 1989) is an ice sledge hockey player from the United States.

He took part in the 2010 Winter Paralympic Games in Vancouver, where the United States won gold. They beat Japan 2–0 in the final.

References

External links
 
 

1989 births
Living people
American sledge hockey players
Paralympic sledge hockey players of the United States
Paralympic gold medalists for the United States
Paralympic bronze medalists for the United States
Ice sledge hockey players at the 2006 Winter Paralympics
Ice sledge hockey players at the 2010 Winter Paralympics
Medalists at the 2006 Winter Paralympics
Medalists at the 2010 Winter Paralympics
Paralympic medalists in sledge hockey